Cheba River is a river of China. It has an average annual flow of 17 cubic meters per second.

References

Rivers of China